Margarites shinkai is a species of sea snail, a marine gastropod mollusk in the family Margaritidae.

Distribution
This marine species occurs near cold seeps off the Sagami Bay, Japan.

References

 Higo, S., Callomon, P. & Goto, Y. (1999). Catalogue and bibliography of the marine shell-bearing Mollusca of Japan. Osaka. : Elle Scientific Publications. 749 pp.

External links
 To Encyclopedia of Life
 To World Register of Marine Species

shinkai
Gastropods described in 1992